Ira Thompson Van Gieson (1866, Long Island – March 24, 1913, New York City) was an American neurologist, psychiatrist, bacteriologist and neuropathologist. 

Ira was born in Long Island in 1866, as the son of Dr. Ransford Everett Van Gieson (1836–1921). He was of Dutch-Jewish heritage. The "Van" is from Dutch "van ("of" or "from"), anglicized with a capital V.
Ira Van Gieson graduated from the College of Physicians of Columbia University in 1885. In 1887, he served as a teacher at the college of physicians and surgeons and in 1894 he was appointed instructor of pathology and histology of the nervous system.

In 1896, he was appointed as first director of the Pathological Institute of the New York State Hospitals for the Insane (renamed New York State Psychiatric Institute in 1929). He was dismissed after five years because of political controversy involving the newly appointed president of the NY State Commission on Lunacy, Peter Wise.
As a result, the whole Institute's faculty resigned
and in 1900 a formal "Protest of the Friends of the Present Management of the N.Y. Pathological Institute" was signed (S. Weir Mitchell, James J. Putnam, Percival Bailey, Morton Prince, Frederick Peterson, and many others). After dismissal, he returned into the service of the New York State Health Department. He practised hypnosis and occasionally served as a forensic psychiatrist.

He died at the age of 47 at the Bellevue Hospital, NY, on March 24, 1913. He suffered from chronic nephritis.

His obituarist, William Alanson White, wrote:
"Dr. Van Gieson can best be described in a few words as a genius. He knew none of the rules that applied to the average man. He had a keen and incisive mind, he was alert and full of interest in everything, but he possessed that sensitive organization which made anything approaching control from outside sources utterly unsupportable. He was a spasmodic and irregular worker, when he worked, working with a fervor and depth of distraction that made him utterly forget time, food and, sleep, working for days and days without rest, way into the small hours of the morning. These periods of tremendous activity were followed by days of inactivity, during which he did nothing, and sometimes was entirely inaccessible, not even attending his office. He was, however, tremendously productive."
Van Gieson introduced the picric acid stain (Van Gieson's stain) to neurohistology in 1889. He coined the term "psychomotor epilepsy".

He collaborated with Boris Sidis, Bernard Sachs, and others.

Works
 Ira Van Gieson is the sole author unless otherwise indicated
 
 
 Laboratory notes of technical methods for the nervous system. New York, 1889
 
 
 Alternate paralysis due to multiple areas of softening in the pons varolii, extracted from the proceedings of the New York Pathological Society, 1890, in Miscellaneous Papers from the Laboratory of the Alumni Association, Department of Pathology, Columbia University, vol 1, 1890–1891, pp 1–3
 A Study of the Artefacts of the Nervous System: The Topographical Alterations of the Gray and White Matters of the Spinal Cord Caused by Autopsy Bruises, and a Consideration of Heterotopia of the Spinal Cord. D. Appleton and Co., 1892
 
 
 
 The toxic basis of neural diseases. State Hospitals Bull I:407–488 (1896)
 (with Arnold Graf) The individuality of the cell. State Hospitals Bulletin (April, 1897)
 Epilepsy and expert testimony. Utica, 1897
 (with Boris Sidis) Neuron energy and its psychomotor manifestations. Archives of Neurology and Psychopathology 1, pp. 5–24 (1898) link
 
 Correlation of sciences in the investigation of nervous and mental diseases. State Hospitals Press, 1899 PDF (Internet Archive)

References

1866 births
American pathologists
1913 deaths
American people of Dutch descent
New York State Department of Health